Volosovo is a town and the administrative center of Volosovsky District in Leningrad Oblast, Russia, located on the railway between St. Petersburg and Tallinn, Estonia,  southwest from St. Petersburg. Population:

History
It was founded in 1870 as a settlement around the railway station on the railway connecting St. Petersburg and Revel. The name originates from the nearby village of Volosovo. Volosovo was a part of Petergofsky Uyezd of St. Petersburg Governorate). On February 14, 1923, Petergofsky Uyezd was merged with Detskoselsky Uyezd to form Gatchinsky Uyezd, with the administrative center located in Gatchina. On the same day, Gatchina was renamed Trotsk and Gatchinsky Uyezd was renamed Trotsky Uyezd, after Leon Trotsky.

On August 1, 1927, the uyezds were abolished and Volosovsky District, with the administrative center in the settlement of Volosovo, was established. The governorates were also abolished and the district became a part of Leningrad Okrug of Leningrad Oblast. On April 20, 1930, Volosovo was granted suburban settlement status. On July 5, 1937, its status was changed to work settlement. Between August 1941 and January 1944, during World War II, Volosovo was occupied by German troops. On February 1, 1963, Volosovsky District was abolished and merged into Kingiseppsky District; on January 13, 1965, however, it was re-established. It had remained the last district of Leningrad Oblast the administrative center of which was not a town; this changed on April 14, 1999 when town status was granted to Volosovo. During the Soviet period it was a developed industrial town.

Administrative and municipal status
Within the framework of administrative divisions, Volosovo serves as the administrative center of Volosovsky District. As an administrative division, it is, together with the village of Lagonovo, incorporated within Volosovsky District as Volosovskoye Settlement Municipal Formation. As a municipal division, Volosovskoye Settlement Municipal Formation is incorporated within Volosovsky Municipal District as Volosovskoye Urban Settlement.

Economy

Industry
There are enterprises of food and timber industries in Volosovo.

Transportation
Volosovo has a railway station on the railway connecting St. Petersburg (Baltiysky railway station) with Tallinn via Narva.

The town has access to the A180 Highway, which connects St. Petersburg and Ivangorod and runs north of Volosovo. It coincides with the European route E20 connecting St. Petersburg via Tallinn with Shannon Airport. Volosovo is also connected by roads with Gatchina and Kingisepp. There are local roads as well.

Military
Southwest of Volosovo was the Sumsk air base facility, which saw some use during the Cold War.

Culture and recreation
Volosovo contains one object classified as cultural and historical heritage of local significance. This is a mass grave of Red Army soldiers killed during the Civil War in Russia and during World War II.

References

Notes

Sources

Cities and towns in Leningrad Oblast
Volosovsky District
Petergofsky Uyezd